Christopher Charles Amoo (born 14 October 1952) is a British singer-songwriter and the lead singer of English soul group, The Real Thing. He is also a dog breeder, and a judge at dog shows including Crufts, where he has had great success with his Afghan Hound, Viscount Grant.

Background
Amoo was born on 14 October 1952 in Liverpool, England.  He comes from a mixed-race background, with a Ghanaian grandfather and an Irish grandmother. His elder brother Eddie Amoo was also a member of The Real Thing; he died 23 February 2018.  Amoo is married to Julie Amoo née Mello.

Music

The Real Thing
As a member of The Real Thing, he had great success with "You to Me Are Everything", "Can't Get By Without You", and "Can You Feel the Force?".

In March 1977, the song he co-wrote with his brother "You'll Never Know What You're Missing" was at No 23 in the Billboard chart, having been at No. 20 the previous week.

Solo
In 1981, his single "This Must Be Love", (a Phil Collins composition) b/w "You'll Never Know What You're Missing" was released on the Precision label.
In March 1984, a single recorded with Debby Bishop was released on EMI. The song "No Choir of Angels" was backed with "Love Talk".
In April that year, along with Alan Price and others, he appeared in the final episode of a show hosted by Marti Caine.

In 1976, he sang on early versions of "Forever Autumn" and "Thunder Child" during Jeff Wayne's War of the Worlds project.  His vocal performances were never used.

Discography

Dog shows
As a successful dog breeder, he and his wife Julie Amoo entered their Afghan Hound, named Viscount Grant, into Crufts dog show, where he won the 1987 Best in Show title. Also that year he was one of the Easter Team Match judges at The Junior Handlers Club.

In Crufts 2013, his Afghan hound won third place in its class.

In 2015, he was a judge at the Irish Wolfhound, Levriero irlandese – 25th French Breed Show event.

In May 2016, he was on the judges panel at the CAC show. Also in 2016, he was a judge at E.I.W.C 2016.

In 2023 his wolfhound, Sade Paris, won Best in Group at Crufts.

Television

Radio

Film

References

1952 births
Living people
21st-century Black British male singers
Dog breeders
Dog judges
English male singer-songwriters
English male singers
English people of Ghanaian descent
English people of Irish descent
English soul singers